David Denby (born 1943) is an American journalist. He served as film critic for The New Yorker until December 2014.

Early life and education
Denby grew up in New York City. He received a B. A. from Columbia University in 1965, and a master's degree from its journalism school in 1966.

Career

Journalism
Denby began writing film criticism while a graduate student at Stanford University's Department of Communication. He began his professional life in the early 1970s as an adherent of the film critic Pauline Kael—one of a group of film writers informally, and sometimes derisively, known as "the Paulettes." Denby wrote for The Atlantic Monthly, the Boston Phoenix, and New York before arriving at The New Yorker; his first article for the magazine was published in 1993, and beginning in 1998 he served as a staff writer and film critic, alternating his critical duties week by week with Anthony Lane.

Denby participated in the 2012 Sight & Sound critics' poll, where he listed his ten favorite films as follows: L'Avventura, Citizen Kane, The Godfather Part II, Journey to Italy, The Life of Oharu, The Rules of the Game, Seven Samurai, Sunrise, The Tree of Life, and Vertigo.

In December 2014, it was announced that Denby would step down as film critic in early 2015, continuing with The New Yorker as a staff writer.

Jonathan Rosenbaum wrote: "David Denby – the film critic who can be counted on most regularly to express American doublethink with the least amount of self-consciousness".

Books

Denby's Great Books (1996) is a non-fiction account of the Western canon-oriented Core Curriculum at his alma mater, Columbia University. In The New York Times, the writer Joyce Carol Oates called the book "a lively adventure of the mind," filled with "unqualified enthusiasm." Great Books was a New York Times bestseller. In The Modern Mind: An Intellectual History of the 20th century, Peter Watson called "Great Books" the "most original response to the culture wars." The book has been published in 13 foreign editions.

In 2004, Denby published American Sucker, a memoir which details his investment misadventures in the dot-com stock market bubble, along with his own bust years as a divorcé from writer Cathleen Schine, leading to a major reassessment of his life. Allan Sloan in The New York Times called the author "formidably smart," while noting this paradox: "Mr. Denby is even smart enough to realize how paradoxical it is that he not only has a good, prestigious job, but that he is also in a position to make money by relating how he lost money in the stock market."Snark, published in 2009, is Denby's polemical dissection of the spread of low, annihilating sarcasm in the Internet and in public speech. In 2012, Denby collected his best film writing in Do the Movies Have a Future?''

Bibliography

References

External links
 
 David Denby archive, New York (articles from January 1998 to January 2001)

1943 births
Living people
American film critics
American memoirists
American social sciences writers
Columbia College (New York) alumni
Ethical Culture Fieldston School alumni
Harper's Magazine people
The New Yorker critics
The New Yorker staff writers
Stanford University alumni
Writers from New York City
Columbia University Graduate School of Journalism alumni